Plassey College, established in 2010, is a general degree college in historical Plassey, Nadia district. It offers undergraduate courses in arts. It is affiliated to  University of Kalyani.

Departments

Arts
Bengali
English
History
Political Science
Education 
Geography

References

Universities and colleges in Nadia district
Colleges affiliated to University of Kalyani
Educational institutions established in 2010
2010 establishments in West Bengal